Lupeşti may refer to:

Lupeşti, a village in Vărădia de Mureș Commune, Arad County, Romania
Lupeşti, a village in Mănăstirea Cașin Commune, Bacău County, Romania
Lupeşti, a village in Mălușteni Commune, Vaslui County, Romania

See also 
 Lupu (disambiguation)
 Lupșa (disambiguation)
 Lupoaia (disambiguation)